Idahlu (also Romanized as Īdahlū) is a village in Quri Chay-ye Sharqi Rural District, in the Central District of Charuymaq County, East Azerbaijan Province, Iran. At the 2006 census, its population was 81, in 12 families.

References 

Populated places in Charuymaq County